This timeline of ancient history lists historical events of the documented ancient past from the beginning of recorded history until the Early Middle Ages. Prior to this time period, prehistory civilizations were pre-literate and did not have written language.

Millennia:
4th millennium BCE -
3rd millennium BCE -
2nd millennium BCE -
1st millennium BCE -
1st millennium

Centuries:
34th BCE -
33rd BCE -
32nd BCE -
31st BCE -
30th BCE -
29th BCE -
28th BCE -
27th BCE -
26th BCE -
25th BCE -
24th BCE -
23rd BCE -
22nd BCE -
21st BCE -
20th BCE -
19th BCE -
18th BCE -
17th BCE -
16th BCE -
15th BCE -
14th BCE -
13th BCE -
12th BCE -
11th BCE -
10th BCE -
9th BCE -
8th BC -
7th BC -
6th BC -
5th BC -
4th BC -
3rd BC -
2nd BC -
1st BC -
1st CE - 
2nd CE -
3rd CE -
4th

Early history

c. 3200 BCE: Sumerian cuneiform writing system and Egyptian hieroglyphs are first used
3200 BCE: Cycladic culture in Greece
3200 BCE: Caral-Supe civilization begins in Peru
3200 BCE: Rise of Proto-Elamite Civilization in Iran
3150 BCE: First Dynasty of Egypt
3100 BCE: Skara Brae is built in Scotland
c. 3000 BCE: Stonehenge construction begins. In its first version, it consisted of a circular ditch and bank, with 56 wooden posts.
c. 3000 BCE: Cucuteni–Trypillia culture is established in Romania and Ukraine.
3000 BCE: Jiroft culture begins in Iran
3000 BCE: First known use of papyrus by Egyptians
3000–2500 BCE: Earliest evidence of autochthonous iron production in West Africa.
3000–2300 BCE: The East African Pastoral neolithic culture builds East Africa's earliest and largest monumental cemetery at Lothagam North Pillar Site.
2800 BCE: Kot Diji phase of the Indus Valley Civilisation begins
3000 BCE: Domestication of the horse in the Yamnaya culture.
2800 BCE: Longshan culture begins in China
2700 BCE: Minoan civilization ancient palace city Knossos reaches 80,000 inhabitants
2700 BCE: Rise of Elam in Iran.
2700 BCE: The Old Kingdom begins in Egypt.
2600 BCE: Oldest known surviving literature: Sumerian texts from Abu Salabikh, including the Instructions of Shuruppak and the Kesh temple hymn.
2600 BCE: Mature Harappan phase of the Indus Valley civilization (in present-day Pakistan and India) begins
2600 BCE: Emergence of Mayan culture in the Yucatán Peninsula
2560 BCE: King Khufu completes the Great Pyramid of Giza.  The Land of Punt in the Horn of Africa first appears in Egyptian records around this time.
2500–1500 BCE: Kerma culture begins in Nubia
2500 BCE: The last mammoth population, on Wrangel Island in Siberia, goes extinct.
2492 BCE: Traditional date for the legendary foundation of Armenia by Hayk.
2334 or 2270 BCE: Akkadian Empire is founded, dating depends upon whether the Middle chronology or the Short chronology is used
2250 BCE: Oldest known depiction of the Staff God, the oldest image of a god to be found in the Americas
2200–2100 BCE: 4.2-kiloyear event: a severe aridification phase, likely connected to a Bond event, which was registered throughout most of North Africa, Middle East and continental North America. Related droughts very likely caused the collapse of the Old Kingdom in Egypt and the Akkadian Empire in Mesopotamia
2200 BCE: completion of Stonehenge
2055 BCE: The Middle Kingdom begins in Egypt
1900 BCE: Erlitou culture begins in China
1800 BCE: Alphabetic writing emerges
1800 BCE: The Old Babylonian text of the Epic of Gilgamesh is written. Possibly the oldest significant work of literature
1780 BCE: Oldest Record of Hammurabi's Code.
1700 BCE: Indus Valley Civilization comes to an end but is continued by the Cemetery H culture; The beginning of Poverty Point culture in North America
1600 BCE: Minoan civilization on Crete is destroyed by the Minoan eruption of Santorini island
1600 BCE: Mycenaean Greece
1600 BCE: The beginning of Shang dynasty in China, evidence of a fully developed writing system, see Oracle bone script
1600 BCE: Beginning of Hittite dominance of the Eastern Mediterranean region
c. 1550 BCE: The New Kingdom begins in Egypt
1500 BCE: Composition of the Rigveda is completed
1700–1400 BCE: The Proto-Sinaitic script is the oldest alphabet created in Egypt.
c. 1400 BCE: Oldest known song with notation
1400–400 BCE: Olmec civilization flourishes in Pre-Columbian Mexico, during Mesoamerica's Formative period
1200 BCE: The Hallstatt culture begins
1200–1150 BCE: Bronze Age collapse occurs in Southwestern Asia and in the Eastern Mediterranean region. This period is also the setting of the Iliad and the Odyssey epic poems (which were composed about four centuries later).
c. 1180 BCE: Disintegration of Hittite Empire
1100 BCE: Use of Iron spreads.
1050 BCE: The Phoenician alphabet is created
1046 BCE: The Zhou force (led by King Wu of Zhou) overthrow the last king of Shang dynasty; Zhou dynasty established in China
1000 BCE: Nok culture begins in West Africa
1000 BCE: The second stream of Bantu expansion reaches the great lakes region of Africa, creating a major population centre.
890 BCE: Approximate date for the composition of the Iliad and the Odyssey
814 BCE: Foundation of Carthage by the Phoenicians in today known Tunisia
800 BCE: Rise of Greek city-states
788 BCE: Iron Age begins in Sungai Batu (Old Kedah)
c. 785 BCE: Rise of the Kingdom of Kush

Classical antiquity 

Classical antiquity is a broad term for a long period of cultural history centered on the Mediterranean Sea, comprising the interlocking civilizations of Ancient Greece and Ancient Rome. It refers to the timeframe of Ancient Greece and Ancient Rome. Ancient history includes the recorded Greek history beginning in about 776 BCE (First Olympiad). This coincides roughly with the traditional date of the founding of Rome in 753 BCE and the beginning of the history of Rome.

776 BCE: First recorded Ancient Olympic Games.
771 BCE: Spring and Autumn period begins in China; Zhou dynasty's power is diminishing; the era of the Hundred Schools of Thought.
753 BCE: Founding of Rome (traditional date)
745 BCE: Tiglath-Pileser III becomes the new king of Assyria. With time he conquers neighboring countries and turns Assyria into an empire.
728 BCE: Rise of the Median Empire.
700 BCE: The construction of Marib Dam in Arabia Felix, in modern Saudi Arabia and Yemen.
653 BCE: Rise of Achaemenid dynasty.
650–550 BCE: The Urewe culture dominates the African Great Lakes region. It was one of Africa's oldest iron smelting centres.
612 BCE: An alliance between the Babylonians, Medes, and Scythians succeeds in destroying Nineveh and causing subsequent fall of the Assyrian empire.
600 BCE: Pandyan kingdom is founded in South India.
600 BCE: Sixteen Mahajanapadas ("Great Realms" or "Great Kingdoms") emerge in India.
600 BCE: Evidence of writing system appears in Oaxaca used by the Zapotec civilization.
c. 600 BCE: Rise of the Sao civilization near Lake Chad.
563 BCE: Siddhartha Gautama (Buddha), founder of Buddhism is born as a prince of the Shakya clan, which ruled parts of Magadha, one of the Mahajanapadas.
551 BCE: Confucius, founder of Confucianism, is born.
550 BCE: Foundation of the Achaemenid Empire by Cyrus the Great.
549 BCE: Mahavira, founder of Jainism, is born.
546 BCE: Cyrus the Great overthrows Croesus, King of Lydia.
544 BCE: Rise of Magadha as the dominant power under Bimbisara.
539 BCE: The fall of the Neo-Babylonian Empire and liberation of the Jews by Cyrus the Great.
529 BCE: Death of Cyrus the Great
525 BCE: Cambyses II of Persia conquers Ancient Egypt.
c. 512 BCE: Darius I (Darius the Great) of Persia, subjugates eastern Thrace, Macedonia submits voluntarily, and annexes the Libyan Kingdom, Persian Empire at largest extent.
509 BCE: Expulsion of Lucius Tarquinius Superbus, founding of Roman Republic (traditional date).
508 BCE: Athenian democracy instituted at the Republic of Athens
500 BCE: Panini standardizes the grammar and morphology of Sanskrit in the text Ashtadhyayi. Panini's standardized Sanskrit is known as Classical Sanskrit.
499 BCE: King Aristagoras of Miletus incites all of Hellenic Asia Minor to rebel against the Persian Empire, beginning the Greco-Persian Wars.
490 BCE: Greek city-states defeat Persian invasion at Battle of Marathon
483 BCE: Death of Gautama Buddha
480 BCE: Persian invasion of Greece by Xerxes I; Battles of Thermopylae and Salamis
479 BCE: Death of Confucius
475 BCE: Warring States period begins in China as the Zhou king became a mere figurehead; China is annexed by regional warlords
470/469 BCE: Birth of Socrates
465 BCE: Murder of Xerxes I
460 BCE: Birth of Democritus
458 BCE: The Oresteia by Aeschylus, the only surviving trilogy of ancient Greek plays, is performed. 
449 BCE: The Greco-Persian Wars end.
447 BCE: Building of the Parthenon at Athens started
432 BCE: Construction of the Parthenon is completed
431 BCE: Beginning of the Peloponnesian War between the Greek city-states
429 BCE: Sophocles's play Oedipus Rex is first performed
427 BCE: Birth of Plato
424 BCE: Nanda dynasty comes to power in Magadha.
404 BCE: End of the Peloponnesian War
400 BCE: Zapotec culture flourishes around city of Monte Albán
c. 400 BCE: Rise of the Garamantes as an irrigation-based desert state in the Fezzan region of Libya
399 BCE: Death of Socrates
384 BCE: Birth of Aristotle
370 BCE: Death of Democritus
331 BCE: Alexander the Great defeats Darius III of Persia in the Battle of Gaugamela, completing his conquest of Persia.
326 BCE: Alexander the Great defeats Indian king Porus in the Battle of the Hydaspes River.
323 BCE: Death of Alexander the Great at Babylon.
322 BCE: Death of Aristotle
321 BCE: Chandragupta Maurya overthrows the Nanda Dynasty of Magadha.
321 BCE: Establishment of the Seleucid Empire by Seleucus I Nicator. The empire existed until 63 BCE.
305 BCE: Chandragupta Maurya seizes the satrapies of Paropamisadae (Kabul), Aria (Herat), Arachosia (Qanadahar) and Gedrosia (Baluchistan) from Seleucus I Nicator, the Macedonian satrap of Babylonia, in return for 500 elephants.
c. 300 BCE: Completion of Euclid's Elements
c. 300 BCE: Pingala uses zero and binary numeral system
300 BCE: Sangam literature (Tamil: சங்க இலக்கியம், Canka ilakkiyam) period in the history of ancient southern India (known as the Tamilakam) 
300 BCE: Chola Empire forms in South India
300 BCE: Construction of the Great Pyramid of Cholula, the world's largest pyramid by volume (the Great Pyramid of Giza built 2560 BCE Egypt stands 146.5 meters, making it 91.5 meters taller), begins in Cholula, Puebla, Mexico.
273 BCE: Ashoka becomes the emperor of the Maurya Empire
261 BCE: Kalinga War
257 BCE: An Durong Vurong takes over Việt Nam (then Kingdom of Âu Lạc)
255 BCE: Ashoka sends a Buddhist missionary led by his son who was Mahinda Thero (Buddhist monk) to Sri Lanka (then Lanka) Mahinda (Buddhist monk)
250 BCE: Rise of Parthia (Ashkâniân), the second native dynasty of ancient Persia
232 BCE: Death of Emperor Ashoka; Decline of the Mauryan Empire
230 BCE: Emergence of Satavahana in South India
221 BCE: Qin Shi Huang unifies China, end of Warring States period; marking the beginning of Imperial rule in China which lasts until 1912. Construction of the Great Wall by the Qin Dynasty begins.
216 BCE Battle of Cannae - Rome defeated in major battle in the second Punic War
207 BCE: Kingdom of Nanyue extends from Guangzhou to North Việt Nam .
206 BCE: Han dynasty established in China, after the death of Qin Shi Huang; China in this period officially becomes a Confucian state and opens trading connections with the West, i.e. the Silk Road.
202 BCE: Scipio Africanus defeats Hannibal at Battle of Zama.
200 BCE: El Mirador, largest early Maya city, flourishes.
200 BCE: Paper is invented in the Han Dynasty.
c. 200 BCE: Chera dynasty in South India.
185 BCE: Shunga Empire founded.
167–160 BCE: Maccabean Revolt.
149–146 BCE: Third Punic War between Rome and Carthage. War ends with the complete destruction of Carthage, allowing Rome to conquer modern day Tunisia and Libya. 
146 BCE: Roman conquest of Greece, see Roman Greece
c. 145 BCE: Eucratides I dies; Greco-Bactrian Kingdom collapses. Remnants move southwards to form the Indo-Greek Kingdom.
121 BCE: Roman armies enter Gaul for the first time. 
111 BCE: First Chinese domination of Việtnam in the form of the Nanyue Kingdom.
c. 100 BCE: Chola dynasty rises in prominence.
100 BCE – 100 CE: Bantu speaking communities in the great lakes region of Africa develop iron forging techniques that enable them to produce carbon steel.
100 BCE – 300 CE: The earliest Bantu settlements in the Swahili coast appear on the archaeological record in Kwale County in Kenya, Misasa in Tanzania and Ras Hafun in Somalia.
c. 82 BCE: Burebista becomes the king of Dacia.
71 BCE: Death of Spartacus. End of the Third Servile War, a major slave uprising against the Roman Republic
c. 63 BCE: The Siege of Jerusalem leads to the conquest of Judea by the Romans.
c. 60–44 BCE: Burebista conquers territories from south Germany to Thrace, reaching the coast of the Aegean sea.
49 BCE: Roman Civil War between Julius Caesar and Pompey the Great.
44 BCE: Julius Caesar murdered by Marcus Brutus and others; End of Roman Republic; beginning of Roman Empire.
44 BCE: Burebista is assassinated in the same year like Julius Caesar and his empire breaks into 4 and later 5 kingdoms in modern-day Romania.
31–30 BCE: Battle of Actium. The Roman conquest of Ptolemaic Egypt.
30 BCE: Cleopatra ends her reign as the last active ruler of the Ptolemaic Kingdom of Egypt
27 BCE: Formation of Roman Empire: Augustus is given titles of Princeps and Augustus by Roman Senate – beginning of Pax Romana. Formation of influential Praetorian Guard to provide security to Emperor.
27–22 BCE: Amanirenas, the kandake (Queen) of the Kingdom of Kush, leads Kushite armies against the Romans.
18 BCE: Three Kingdoms period begins in Korea. Herod's Temple is reconstructed.
6 BCE: Earliest theorized date for birth of Jesus of Nazareth. Roman succession: Gaius Caesar and Lucius Caesar groomed for the throne.
4 BCE: Widely accepted date (Ussher) for birth of Jesus Christ.
c. 1–50: The Periplus of the Erythrean Sea, a Graeco-Roman manuscript is written. It describes an established Indian Ocean Trade route
9: Battle of the Teutoburg Forest, the Imperial Roman Army's bloodiest defeat.
14: Death of Roman Emperor Augustus Caesar (Octavian), ascension of his adopted son Tiberius to the throne.
26–34: Crucifixion of Jesus Christ, exact date unknown.
37: Death of Emperor Tiberius, ascension of his nephew Caligula to the throne. 
40: Rome conquers Mauretania.
41: Emperor Caligula is assassinated by the Roman senate. His uncle Claudius succeeds him.
43: The Roman Empire enters Great Britain for the first time. 
54: Emperor Claudius dies and is succeeded by his grand nephew Nero.
68: Emperor Nero commits suicide, prompting the Year of the Four Emperors in Rome.
70: Destruction of Jerusalem by the armies of Titus. 
79: Destruction of Pompeii by the volcano Vesuvius.
98: After a two-year rule, Emperor Nerva dies of natural causes, his adopted son Trajan succeeds him.
100–940: Kingdom of Aksum forms in the Horn of Africa
106–117: Roman Empire at largest extent under Trajan after having conquered modern-day Romania, Iraq and Armenia.
117: Trajan dies of natural causes. His adopted son Hadrian succeeds him. Hadrian pulls out of Iraq and Armenia.
122: Construction of Hadrian's Wall begins.
126: Hadrian completes the Roman Pantheon.
138: Hadrian dies of natural causes. His adopted son Antoninus Pius succeeds him. 
161: Death of Antoninus Pius. His rule was the only one in which Rome did not fight in a war.
161: Marcus Aurelius becomes emperor of the Roman Empire.
180: Reign of Marcus Aurelius officially ends.
180–181: Commodus becomes Roman Emperor. 
192: Kingdom of Champa in Tay Nguyen.
200s: The Buddhist Srivijaya Empire established in Maritime Southeast Asia.
220: Three Kingdoms period begins in China after the fall of Han Dynasty.
226: Fall of the Parthian Empire and Rise of the Sassanian Empire.
238: Defeat of Gordian III (238–244), Philip the Arab (244–249), and Emperor Valerian (253–260), by Shapur I of Persia (Valerian was captured by the Persians).
280: Emperor Wu of Jin established the First Jin Dynasty providing a temporary unity of China after the devastating Three Kingdoms period.
285: Diocletian becomes emperor of Rome and splits the Roman Empire into Eastern and Western Roman Empires.
285: Diocletian begins a large-scale persecution of Christians. 
292: The capital of the Roman empire is officially moved from Rome to Mediolanum (modern day Milan).
300–1000: Growth of Azanian and Zanj settlements in the Swahili coast. Local industry and international trade flourish.
301: Diocletian's edict on maximum prices
301: Armenia first to adopt Christianity as state religion.
313: Edict of Milan declared that the Roman Empire would tolerate all forms of religious worship.
325: Constantine I organizes the First Council of Nicaea.
330: Constantinople is officially named and becomes the capital of the eastern Roman Empire.
335: Samudragupta becomes the emperor of the Gupta empire.
337: Emperor Constantine I dies, leaving his sons Constantius II, Constans I, and Emperor Constantine II as the emperors of the Roman empire.
350: Constantius II is left sole emperor with the death of his two brothers.
354: Birth of Augustine of Hippo
361: Constantius II dies, his cousin Emperor Julian succeeds him.
378: Battle of Adrianople, Roman army is defeated by the Germanic tribes.
380: Roman Emperor Theodosius I declares the Arian faith of Christianity heretical. 
395: Theodosius I outlaws all religions other than Catholic Christianity.
406: Romans are expelled from Britain.
407–409: Visigoths and other Germanic tribes cross into Roman-Gaul for the first time.
410: Visigoths sack Rome in 410 for the first time since 390 BC.
415: Germanic tribes enter Spain.
429: Vandals enter North Africa from Spain for the first time
439: Vandals have conquered the land stretching from Morocco to Tunisia by this time.
455: Vandals sack Rome, capture Sicily and Sardinia. 
c. 455: Skandagupta repels a Huna people attack on India.
476: Romulus Augustulus, last Western Roman Emperor is forced to abdicate by Odoacer, a chieftain of the Germanic Heruli; Odoacer returns the imperial regalia to Eastern Roman Emperor Zeno in Constantinople in return for the title of dux of Italy; most frequently cited date for the end of ancient history.

End of ancient history in Europe
The date used as the end of the ancient era is arbitrary. The transition period from Classical Antiquity to the Early Middle Ages is known as Late Antiquity. Late Antiquity is a periodization used by historians to describe the transitional centuries from Classical Antiquity to the Middle Ages, in both mainland Europe and the Mediterranean world: generally from the end of the Roman Empire's Crisis of the Third Century (c. ACE 284) to the Islamic conquests and the re-organization of the Byzantine Empire under Heraclius. The Early Middle Ages are a period in the history of Europe following the fall of the Western Roman Empire spanning roughly five centuries from CE 500 to 1000. Not all historians agree on the ending dates of ancient history, which frequently falls somewhere in the 5th, 6th, or 7th century. Western scholars usually date the end of ancient history with the fall of the Western Roman Empire in CE 476, the death of the emperor Justinian I in CE 565, or the coming of Islam in CE 632 as the end of classical antiquity.

Maps

See also
Timeline of Roman history
Timeline of post-classical history
Timelines of modern history

References

  Thorndike 1923, Becker 1931, MacMullen 1966, MacMullen 1990, Thomas & Wick 1993, Loftus 1996.
 
 
 
   Web edition is constantly updated.
 
 
 
 
 
 
 
 
  Eight volumes.

Citations and notes

+Timeline
Ancient history

Ancient